Wing Chuen Suen (born 1963) is a Hong Kong economist.

He earned a bachelor's degree in economics at the University of Hong Kong and pursued graduate study at the University of Washington in the United States. He began teaching at the University of Hong Kong in 1989, and in 2006 was named the Henry G Leong Professor in Economics.

References

1963 births
Living people
Hong Kong economists
Alumni of the University of Hong Kong
Academic staff of the University of Hong Kong
University of Washington alumni
Fellows of the Econometric Society